Apaga may refer to:
Apaga (river), a river mentioned in ancient Indian texts
Apaga, Armenia